The Kodak C330 is a model of digital camera produced by the Eastman Kodak Company. It was announced on May 4, 2005 and is part of the company's EasyShare consumer line of cameras.

Input
The camera has a 3x optical zoom, and a 5x digital zoom beyond the optical zoom. The camera is able to record QVGA videos in 24 frame/s. It has auto, scene, portrait, sport, landscape, close-up, and video modes.  Videos may be played on-camera, but with sound only. It has a viewfinder.

Image storage
The camera has 16 MB of internal memory. Memory capacity can be expanded with 16MB, 32MB, 64MB, 128MB, 256MB, 512MB up to a maximum of 1 GB SD or MMC cards.  It includes an AV/USB port for viewing photos on a RCA television with the included adapter or transferring images to a computer via USB.

Review

The camera includes a  LCD screen.

Output 

The camera kit includes a USB cable for uploading images to a computer. It is compatible with the Kodak camera docks and PictBridge printer docks, and card readers.

References

External links

Official Kodak website

C330
Cameras introduced in 2005